Alexander Alexandrovich Besputin (born 26 April 1991) is a Russian professional boxer. As an amateur he won a gold medal at the 2013 European Championships and silver at the 2015 European Games.

Professional career

Besputin vs. Butaev 
Besputin turned professional in 2015 and compiled a record of 13–0 before getting an opportunity to fight for a world title against fellow Russian boxer Radzhab Butaev. Butaev was ranked #3 by the WBA at welterweight at the time. In the fight Besputin would go on to win via unanimous decision to capture the WBA (Regular) and EBP welterweight titles.

Six-month suspension 
In January 2020 it was reported that Besputin had failed a post-fight drug test for the bout with Butaev, testing positive for the performance-enhancing drug Ligandrol. Upon hearing the news, Butaev said, "Ahead of the fight my team insisted on VADA testing while he and his team were denying it all along, and even after I agreed to pay for both sides, including his costs, he was very reluctant. After finally enrolling he attempted to ignore the requests from VADA for two weeks for his whereabouts to be tested." Besputin elected to have a secondary 'B sample' tested, which also came back positive for the same substance in June. Following the second test result, the WBA stripped Besputin of his title and issued a six-month suspension on 4 July.

Besputin vs. Plotnikov 
On 20 March, 2021, Besputin fought Viktor Plotnikov in his comeback fight after his suspension. Besputin dominated in the first two rounds, which prompted the opposition's trainer to end the fight right after the end of the second round.

Professional boxing record

See also
List of world welterweight boxing champions

References

External links

Alexander Besputin - Profile, News Archive & Current Rankings at Box.Live

1991 births
Living people
People from Kamensk-Uralsky
Russian male boxers
Welterweight boxers
World welterweight boxing champions
World Boxing Association champions
European Games silver medalists for Russia
European Games medalists in boxing
Boxers at the 2015 European Games
Doping cases in boxing
Sportspeople from Sverdlovsk Oblast